Bradford was a parliamentary constituency in Bradford, in the West Riding of Yorkshire.

It returned two Members of Parliament (MPs) to the House of Commons of the Parliament of the United Kingdom from 1832 until it was abolished for the 1885 general election.

It was then split into three new constituencies: Bradford Central, Bradford East, and Bradford West.

Boundaries
The constituency was based upon the town of Bradford, in the West Riding of Yorkshire. It was enfranchised as a two-member parliamentary borough from 1832. Before 1832 the area was only represented as part of the county constituency of Yorkshire. After 1832 the non-resident Forty Shilling Freeholders of the area continued to qualify for a county vote (initially in the West Riding of Yorkshire seat, and from 1865 in a division of the West Riding).

Bradford, as a new parliamentary borough, had no voters enfranchised under the ancient rights preserved by the Reform Act 1832. All voters qualified under the new uniform, borough householder franchise.

The area was incorporated as a municipal borough in 1847, covering the parishes of Bradford, Horton and Manningham. Bradford was expanded in 1882 to include Allerton, Bolton, Bowling, Heaton, Thornbury and Tyersall. However the parliamentary boundaries were not affected until the redistribution of 1885.

After the expanded borough was divided into three single member seats in 1885, Bradford became a county borough with the passing of the Local Government Act 1888. The county borough was granted city status by Letters Patent in 1897.

Members of Parliament
Two MPs were elected at each general election. The table below shows the election years in which one or both of the MPs changed.

Elections

Elections in the 1830s

Elections in the 1840s

 

 Caused by Lister's death

Elections in the 1850s

 

 Caused by the death of Busfield.

Elections in the 1860s

 

 Caused by Ripley's election at the 1868 general election being declared void.

 Caused by Forster's appointment as Vice-President of the Committee of the Privy Council for Education.

 
 

 

 

 Caused by Wickham's death.

 Caused by Salt's resignation.

Elections in the 1870s

Elections in the 1880s

 Caused by Forster's appointment as Chief Secretary to the Lord Lieutenant of Ireland.

References

Parliamentary constituencies in Yorkshire and the Humber (historic)
Constituencies of the Parliament of the United Kingdom established in 1832
Constituencies of the Parliament of the United Kingdom disestablished in 1885
Politics of Bradford